General Adams may refer to:

Alexander Adams (British Army officer) (1772–1834), British Army lieutenant general
Carroll Edward Adams (1923–1970), American brigadier general
Charles J. Adams (U.S. Air Force general) (1921–2002), U.S. Air Force brigadier general
Chris Adams (general) (born 1930), U.S. Air Force major general
Clayton Sinnott Adams (1881–1965), U.S. Army adjutant general and brigadier general 
Daniel Weisiger Adams (1821–1872), Confederate States Army brigadier general
Emory Sherwood Adams (1881–1967), U.S. Army adjutant general and major general
Jimmie V. Adams (born 1936), U.S. Air Force four-star general
John Adams (Canadian general) (born 1942), Canadian Armed Forces major general
John Adams (Confederate Army officer) (1825–1864), Confederate States Army brigadier general
John Worthington Adams (1764–1837), British Army major general
Paul D. Adams (1906–1987), U.S. Army general
Ricky G. Adams (fl. 1980s–2010s), U.S. Army National Guard major general
Robert Bellew Adams (1856–1928), British Indian Army major general
Thomas Adams (British Army officer) (c. 1730–1764), British Army major posthumously promoted to brigadier-general
William Wirt Adams (1819–1888), Confederate States Army brigadier general

See also
Clara Leach Adams-Ender (born 1939), U.S. Army brigadier general
Attorney General Adams (disambiguation)